Pobre Pablo, is a Colombian telenovela created by Juan Carlos Pérez for RCN Televisión. Starring by Roberto Cano and Carolina Acevedo. It was the most-watched telenovela of Colombia during the two years that lasted into the air.

Plot 
Pablo, the bodyguard of a wealthy family, lives with his mother and two siblings while posing as a millionaire to win the heart of a rich young woman who lives in Miami, but she is committed to Federico Villegas de la Concha. Cindy, a daughter of a neighbor of the Guerrero family, is in love with Pablo but makes it impossible for Pablo to fall in love with her.

Cast 
Roberto Cano as Pablo Herminio Guerrero 
Carolina Acevedo as María Alcalá
Valentina Rendón as Cindy Mercedes Casilimas
Diego Trujillo as Antonio Santamaría
Pedro Rendón as Alejandro Santamaría
Luisa Fernanda Giraldo as Susy
Ana María Kamper as Ligia de Santamaria
Tatiana Jauregui as Adela
Salvo Basile as Luciano Fisiquella
Alejandro Martínez as Federico Villegas de la Concha
César Mora as José Ramón Alcalá
Andrés Felipe Martínez as Eduardo
Felipe Noguera as Bernardo Gomez "Berny"
Rodrigo Castro as Juancho
Rita Bendek as Dra. Patricia
Pilar Uribe as Ana de Alcalá
Vanessa Simon as Catalina Luzardo
Alfonso Ortiz as Rafael Casilimas
Alberto Valdiri as Salomón Agudelo
Carlos Manuel Vesga as Wilson Casilimas Simbaqueva
Carmenza Gómez as Tulia de Guerrero
Marcela Posada as Milady
Carla Giraldo as Jenny Paola Guerrero
Fanny Lu as Silvanna
María José Tafur as Johanna
Carlos Hurtado as Genaro
Luis Fernando Salas as Néstor Covos
Ana Bolena Meza as Sofía Arbeláez

References

External links 

2000 telenovelas
2000 Colombian television series debuts
2002 Colombian television series endings
Colombian telenovelas
Spanish-language telenovelas
RCN Televisión telenovelas
Television shows set in Bogotá
Television shows set in Cartagena, Colombia
Television shows set in Miami